Sexo con Amor (Sex with Love) is a 2003 Chilean sex comedy film directed and written by Boris Quercia. who also wrote the screenplay and co-stars in the film. Starring Sigrid Alegría, Álvaro Rudolphy, Patricio Contreras, María Izquierdo, and Quercia, the film focuses on parents of schoolchildren taking a sex education course who end up examining their own sex lives. The film was released in March 27, 2003.

Plot 
Luisa, a young and new teacher, organizes a meeting with parents to discuss the approach to sex education at her primary school. However, the topic of sexuality remains unresolved for her and many of the parents, including her secret lover Jorge, a shy butcher named Emilio, and a brash businessman named Álvaro. Sex with Love is the story of how these three parents and the teacher herself are caught off guard by their own erotic desires. Despite professing undying love to their partners, they eagerly embark on a rollercoaster ride of physical relationships, leading to both tragic and hilarious consequences.

Cast
Sigrid Alegría as Luisa
Álvaro Rudolphy as Álvaro
Patricio Contreras as Jorge
María Izquierdo as Maca
Boris Quercia as Emilio
Cecilia Amenábar as Elena
Francisco Pérez-Bannen as Valentín
Javiera Díaz de Valdés as Susan
Loreto Valenzuela as Mónica

References

External links 
 

2003 films
2000s Spanish-language films
2000s sex comedy films
Chilean comedy films
Incest in film
2003 comedy films